Sagzabad or Sagz Abad (Tati: , Sezjowa) is a city in the Central District of Buin Zahra County, Qazvin Province, Iran. At the 2006 census its population was 4,953, in 1,324 families. Sagz-Abad is a Tati-speaking city.

The 14th-century author Hamdallah Mustawfi listed Sagzabad as one of the main villages in the territory of Qazvin.

References 

Buin Zahra County
Cities in Qazvin Province